The Royal Family of Commagene ruled the ancient Greco-Iranian  Kingdom of Commagene.

Family Tree of the Royal Family of Commagene

References

Sources 
 

Commagene
Commagene